Craig Thomas Lawton (born 5 January 1972) is a Welsh former footballer who played for Manchester United and Port Vale in the early 1990s, before playing football in the Welsh leagues for Colwyn Bay, Connah's Quay Nomads, and Bala Town.

Club career
Born in Mancot, Flintshire, Lawton began his career at Alex Ferguson's Manchester United, signing his first professional contract at Old Trafford in July 1990. The closest Lawton got to making an appearance for the "Red Devils" came in a Premier League match against Queens Park Rangers in January 1993, when he was an unused substitute. He was given the number 22 jersey for the 1993–94 season, but did not make a single appearance for United. Soon after, he suffered a broken leg, and was allowed to join Port Vale on a free transfer in July 1994.

He made his First Division debut as a substitute in a 3–2 defeat at Watford on New Year's Eve 1994, but broke a leg in a reserve game in March 1995. His full debut came in a goalless draw with Genoa in an Anglo-Italian Cup game at Vale Park on 8 November 1995. Unable to gain a first team place with the "Valiants" with only five appearances in 1994–95 and 1995–96, manager John Rudge gave him a free transfer to Colwyn Bay in May 1996. He played for Colwyn Bay for six years, before moving to Connah's Quay Nomads, and then Bala Town four years later.

International career
Lawton was capped for Wales at schoolboy, youth, under-21 and "B" internationals.

Career statistics
Source:

References

1972 births
Living people
Sportspeople from Flintshire
Welsh footballers
Wales youth international footballers
Wales under-21 international footballers
Wales B international footballers
Association football midfielders
Manchester United F.C. players
Port Vale F.C. players
Colwyn Bay F.C. players
Connah's Quay Nomads F.C. players
Bala Town F.C. players
English Football League players